Van Hoyweghen is a surname. Notable people with the surname include:

David Van Hoyweghen (born 1976), Belgian footballer
Luc Van Hoyweghen (1929–2013), Belgian footballer

Surnames of Dutch origin